Herbert Earl Williams (born April 30, 1958) is a former American football defensive back who played in three seasons with of the National Football League; One with the San Francisco 49ers then two with the St. Louis Cardinals. He had previously played college football at Southern University for the Southern Jaguars football team.

References

1958 births
Living people
American football defensive backs
Sportspeople from Lafayette, Louisiana
Players of American football from Louisiana
San Francisco 49ers players
St. Louis Cardinals (football) players
Southern Jaguars football players